TFK may refer to:
Telefunken, a German manufacturer of integrated chips
Thousand Foot Krutch (since 1997), Canadian rock band
The Flower Kings (since 1994), Swedish progressive rock band
Time For Kids, a children's edition of Time magazine
The Forbidden Kingdom (2008), a martial arts film starring Jackie Chan and Jet Li